The Boys' handball tournament at the 2014 Summer Youth Olympics in Nanjing was held from 20 to 25 August at the Jiangning Sports Center Gymnasium.

Participating teams

Group A
 
 
 

Group B

Preliminary round
All times are local (UTC+8).

Group A

Group B

Knockout stage

Fifth place game

Brazil wins 66–58 on aggregate

Semifinals

Bronze medal game

Gold medal game

Final ranking

References

Handball at the 2014 Summer Youth Olympics